Francis Edward McGovern (January 21, 1866 – May 16, 1946) was an American lawyer and politician from Wisconsin. He served as the 22nd Governor of Wisconsin from 1911 to 1915. In 1911 especially he sponsored a major series of progressive achievements through the legislature.  Originally a close ally of Senator Robert M. La Follette, the two progressive leaders held an uneasy truce for McGovern's reelection in 1912. The two became bitter enemies in 1913-1916 and McGovern lost his bids for office and retired from poliitics.

Early life
McGovern was born in Elkhart Lake, Sheboygan County, Wisconsin. He graduated from the University of Wisconsin in 1890, and served as high school principal in Brodhead, Wisconsin and Appleton, Wisconsin. He studied law and was admitted to the bar in 1897. He began the practice of law in Milwaukee, Wisconsin.

Political career
He was elected District Attorney in Milwaukee in 1904, and served as District Attorney from 1903 to 1904 and from 1905 to 1908. In 1908, he ran for U.S. Senator but was defeated. He was elected Governor of Wisconsin in 1910 and 1912. McGovern supported the La Follette progressive wing of the Republican Party. He broke with La Follette in 1912 by supporting Theodore Roosevelt for the Republican nomination. LaFollette did support McGovern's reelection in 1912. La Follette worked to defeat him in 1914, in conjunction with anti-tax conservative Republicans. as Governor McGovern had helped introduce the State income tax. He ran for U.S. Senator in 1914 and was defeated.

After leaving the governorship, he resumed the practice of law. When World War I began he entered the U.S. Army as a major, and served as Judge Advocate of the 18th Division. In 1920 he served as general counsel for the U.S. Shipping Board.< He resumed the practice of law in Milwaukee in 1921 and served as president of the Milwaukee Bar Association in 1923. He was a member of the executive committee of the Wisconsin State Bar Association.

He died on May 16, 1946, in Milwaukee, and is interred in Forest Home Cemetery in Milwaukee.

References

Further reading
 Buenker, John D. The History of Wisconsin, Vol. IV: The Progressive Era, 1893-1914 (Wisconsin Historical Society, 1998). 
 Margulies, Herbert F. The Decline of the Progressive Movement in Wisconsin, 1890-1920 (1969)
 Margulies, Herbert F. "The Background of the La Follette-McGovern Schism." Wisconsin Magazine of History (1956) 40#1: 21-29. online
 Stevens, Michael E. " 'A Fair Chance for All' McGovern's Progressivism." Wisconsin Magazine of History 100.4 (2017): 46-51.

External links

 National Governors Association

|-

|-

|-

1866 births
1946 deaths
United States Army personnel of World War I
Burials in Wisconsin
Republican Party governors of Wisconsin
Military personnel from Wisconsin
Milwaukee County District Attorneys
People from Elkhart Lake, Wisconsin
People from Walworth County, Wisconsin
Politicians from Milwaukee
United States Army officers
University of Wisconsin–Madison alumni
Wisconsin Progressives (1912)